Campiglossa solidaginis is a species of fruit fly in the family Tephritidae.

Distribution
The species is found in England, Norway, Sweden, Switzerland, Serbia.

References

Tephritinae
Insects described in 1986
Diptera of Europe